The rugby sevens women's tournament at the 2019 Pan American Games in Lima, Peru was held on 26–28 July 2019, with eight teams participating at the sports center in Villa María del Triunfo.

Qualification 
Eight women's teams qualified to compete in the tournament games. The host nation (Peru) and two core World Sevens Series core teams (Canada and United States) qualified automatically, along with five other teams in various qualifying tournaments.

Summary

Results 
All times are in Peru Time (UTC−5).

Pool stage

Pool A

Pool B

Classification round

5–8th place semifinals

Seventh place match

Fifth place match

Medal round

Semifinals

Bronze medal match

Gold medal match

Final ranking

References 

Women
Pan American Games